Smradi is a Czech drama film. It was released in 2002.

External links
 
Czech drama films
2000s Czech-language films
2002 films
Czech Lion Awards winners (films)
2000s Czech films